Homolka is a surname of Czech origin. Notable people with the surname include:

 Karla Homolka, Canadian serial rapist and killer
 Tammy Homolka, Karla's sister and victim
 Oscar Homolka, Austrian-born actor
 Walter Homolka, German rabbi

See also
 

Czech-language surnames